Paul Hermann Scherrer (3 February 1890 – 25 September 1969) was a Swiss physicist. Born in St. Gallen, Switzerland, he studied at Göttingen, Germany, before becoming a lecturer there. Later, Scherrer became head of the Department of Physics at ETH Zurich.

Early life and studies
Paul Scherrer was born in St. Gallen. In 1908, he enrolled at Swiss Federal Polytechnic (later known as ETH Zurich), changing course from Botany to Mathematics and Physics after two semesters. In 1912, Scherrer spent one semester at Königsberg University, then undertook further studies at the University of Göttingen, graduating from there with a doctorate on the Faraday Effect in the hydrogen molecule. In 1916, while still working on his dissertation, he and his tutor, Peter Debye, developed the “Debye–Scherrer powder method”, a procedure using X-rays for the structural analysis of crystals. This made an important contribution to the development of the scattering techniques that are still used in the large facilities at the Paul Scherrer Institute to this day. Debye received the Nobel Prize for chemistry for this work in 1936.

He is perhaps best known for determining the inverse relationship between the width of an x-ray diffraction peak and the crystallite size.  This work was published in 1918.  P. Scherrer, “Bestimmung der Grösse und der inneren Struktur von Kolloidteilchen mittels Röntgenstrahlen,” Nachr. Ges. Wiss. Göttingen 26 (1918) pp 98–100.

ETH Zurich appointed Scherrer to the post of Professor of Experimental Physics in 1920, at the early age of 30. In 1925, he organised the first international conference of physicists to take place after the First World War. He became Principal of the Physical Institute at ETH in 1927 and focussed its direction on nuclear physics, a research branch that was still coming into being at that stage. The first cyclotron at ETH Zurich was built under his direction in 1940.

In parallel with his main professional occupation as a researcher and leader of an institution, Paul Scherrer also served in various institutions and committees involved in the dissemination of nuclear energy in Switzerland: the Swiss Federal Council appointed him to the post of President of the Swiss Study Commission on Atomic Energy in 1946, and President of the Swiss Commission for Atomic Sciences in 1958. In addition, he also took part in establishing CERN near Geneva in 1954, and in setting up Reaktor AG to study the construction and operation of nuclear fission facilities one year later, in Würenlingen.

His abilities and foresight led to the early development of new branches of solid-state physics, particle physics and electronics, and this made a vital contribution to the high standard of research at Swiss universities. When Paul Scherrer was made emeritus professor in 1960, after 40 years at ETH Zurich, he took up a teaching appointment at the University of Basel. He died in 1969, as the result of a riding accident.

Nuclear and atomic physics

In the 1930s, Scherrer began to specialise in nuclear physics, becoming president of the Schweizerischen Studienkommission für Atomenergie in 1946 and taking part in the 1954 founding of CERN.

Beginning in late 1944, Scherrer became close to Moe Berg and, through Berg, gave the United States information about German science and German scientists, especially related to efforts to develop a nuclear weapon. Scherrer later became the foremost proponent of Switzerland developing its own nuclear weapons with enriched uranium supplied by Belgian Congo, a program which was actively pursued by the government for 43 years and abandoned only in 1988 by Arnold Koller, then member of the Swiss Federal Council and head of the Swiss military department.

Legacy

The eponymous Paul Scherrer Institute, based near Villigen in canton of Aargau, was established January 1, 1988 by merging the 1960 established EIR (Eidgenössisches Institut für Reaktorforschung, Federal Institute for Reactor Research) and the 1968 established SIN (Schweizerisches Institut für Nuklearphysik, Swiss Institute for Nuclear Physics) with Professor Jean-Pierre Blaser (SIN founder) named its first director.

References

External links

1890 births
1969 deaths
People associated with CERN
ETH Zurich alumni
Swiss nuclear physicists
Swiss physicists
Academic staff of ETH Zurich
People from Appenzell Innerrhoden
People from St. Gallen (city)
Fellows of the American Physical Society
Members of the Royal Swedish Academy of Sciences